Ivan Osipovich Yarkovsky (24 May 1844, Asveya, Vitebsk Governorate – 22 January 1902, Heidelberg) was a Polish Russian civil engineer. Born from a Polish family in Asveya (Russian Empire, now Belarus), he worked for a Russian railway company and was obscure in his own time. Beginning in the 1970s, long after Yarkovsky's death, his work on the effects of thermal radiation on small objects in the Solar System (e.g., asteroids) was developed into the Yarkovsky effect and the YORP effect, thanks to his rediscovery by Estonian astronomer Ernst J. Öpik. The asteroid 35334 Yarkovsky is named in his honour . In 1888, he also created a mechanical explanation of gravitation.

References

Literature

External links
 Citations for asteroids discovered at Sormano Astronomical Observatory

1844 births
1902 deaths
People from Verkhnyadzvinsk District
People from Drissensky Uyezd
19th-century Polish astronomers
Polish civil engineers